Shiva Sainya is a 1996 Indian Kannada-language political action drama film directed by Shivamani and produced by Y. S. Ramesh. The film features Shiva Rajkumar and Nivedita Jain in the lead roles. 

The film's score and soundtrack was scored by Ilaiyaraaja and the cinematography was by Krishna Kumar.

Cast 
 Shiva Rajkumar 
 Nivedita Jain
 Arundhati Nag
 C. R. Simha
 Doddanna
 Somashekhar Rao
 Prabhudev B Gowdar
Venki 
Vasudev 
Micheal madhu 
Sudheer 
A. T. Raghu 
 Mukhyamantri Chandru
 Lokanath
 Master Anand
Master Arun 
 Dheerendra Gopal
 Satyabhama
 Mandeep Roy

Soundtrack 
The soundtrack of the film was composed by Ilaiyaraaja.

References

External links 

1996 films
1990s Kannada-language films
Indian action films
Films scored by Ilaiyaraaja
Indian political films
1996 action films
1990s political films
Political action films